Robert E. "Pete" Vaughan (December 29, 1888 – February 18, 1969) was an American football player, coach of football and basketball, and college athletics administrator.  He served was head football coach at Wabash College for 27 seasons, from 1919 to 1945, compiling a record of 118–85–24.

In 1922, he also coached Wabash to the championship of the first national intercollegiate basketball tournament ever held.  Prior to coaching Wabash, he spent four seasons (1912–1916) coaching the Purdue Boilermakers basketball team, leading them to a record of 21–32.

Vaughan attended Crawfordsville High School and the University of Notre Dame. He played college football alongside Knute Rockne, who became the head coach of the Fighting Irish.

Head coaching record

Football

References

External links
 

1888 births
1969 deaths
American football fullbacks
Basketball coaches from Indiana
Notre Dame Fighting Irish football players
Purdue Boilermakers men's basketball coaches
Wabash Little Giants athletic directors
Wabash Little Giants basketball coaches
Wabash Little Giants football coaches
Crawfordsville High School alumni
People from Crawfordsville, Indiana
Players of American football from Indiana